is a Japanese footballer currently playing as a defender for Avispa Fukuoka.

Career statistics

Club
.

Notes

References

External links

2002 births
Living people
Association football people from Fukuoka Prefecture
Japanese footballers
Japan youth international footballers
Association football defenders
Avispa Fukuoka players